Live – Acoustic Tour 2006 is the seventh album by American singer/songwriter Maria McKee, released in 2006 (see 2006 in music).

Track listing
"This World Is Not My Home"
"Peddlin' Dreams"
"Shelter"
"High Dive/Barstool Blues"
"Orange Skies" (Bryan MacLean)
"Breathe" (Maria McKee & Gregg Sutton)
"In The Long Run"
"Don't Toss Us Away" (MacLean)
"Belfry"
"A Good Heart"
"Sullen Soul"
"Blessed Salvation"
"Has He Got A Friend For Me" (Richard Thompson)
"Backstreets" (Bruce Springsteen)

References

Live - Acoustic Tour 2006
2006 live albums
Cooking Vinyl live albums